Kamarusak-e Bala (also Romanized as Kam‘arūsak-e Bālā; also known as Kam ‘Arūsak-e ‘Olyā) is a village in Madvarat Rural District, in the Central District of Shahr-e Babak County, Kerman Province, Iran. At the 2006 census, its population was 25, in 6 families.

References 

Populated places in Shahr-e Babak County